Ridder may refer to:

Places
DeRidder, Louisiana, city in US state of Louisiana
Ridder, Kazakhstan, settlement in Kazakhstan (named for Philip Ridder)

Things
Ridder (title), Dutch and Belgian title equivalent to knight
Knight Ridder, newspaper chain
Arbeidets Ridder, US newspaper (1880s), published in Minneapolis, Minnesota (Norwegian/Danish language; concerning news of interest to labor groups)
Ridder Arena, an ice hockey arena in Saint Paul, Minnesota

People
Alexandra Simons de Ridder (born 1963), German equestrian
Bernard J. Ridder (1913–1983), American newspaper publisher
Daniël de Ridder (born 1984), Dutch football player
Desmond Ridder (born 1999), American football player
Eric Ridder (1918–1996), US sailor and Olympic athlete
Georgia B. Ridder (1914–2002), American thoroughbred racehorse owner
Herman Ridder (1851–1915), American newspaper publisher and editor
Kathleen Ridder (1922–2017), American activist and philanthropist
Koen Ridder (born 1985), Dutch badminton player
Louis De Ridder (1902–1981), Belgian winter sports athlete
Luis de Ridder (1928–2004), Argentine alpine skier
Marcello de Ridder (born 1922), Argentine bobsled athlete
Marjan Ridder (born 1953), Dutch badminton player
Peter de Ridder (born 1946), Dutch sailor and businessman
Peter Hollander Ridder (1608–1692), Governor of New Sweden
Philip Ridder (1759–1838), English explorer who discovered valuable metal ores in Kazakhstan
Robert Ridder (1919–2000), American ice hockey administrator, media mogul
Steve De Ridder (born 1987), Belgian football player
Victor F. Ridder (1886–1963), American newspaper publisher